Copeland House may refer to:

Henry Copeland House, Pleasant Grove, Arkansas, listed on the National Register of Historic Places in Stone County, Arkansas 
Wesley Copeland House, Timbo, Arkansas, listed on the National Register of Historic Places in Stone County, Arkansas
William and Ann Copeland Jr. House, Shiloh, Georgia, listed on the National Register of Historic Places in Harris County, Georgia
George Copeland House, Davenport, Iowa, listed on the National Register of Historic Places in Scott County, Iowa
Samuel Copeland House, Worcester, Massachusetts, listed on the NRHP in Massachusetts
Copeland House (Ehrhardt, South Carolina), listed on the National Register of Historic Places in Bamberg County, South Carolina
Williams-Ball-Copeland House, Laurens, South Carolina, listed on the National Register of Historic Places in Laurens County, South Carolina
Copeland House (Parksville, Tennessee), listed on the National Register of Historic Places in Polk County, Tennessee
Austin Copeland House I, Houston, Texas, listed on the National Register of Historic Places in Harris County, Texas
Austin Copeland House II, Houston, Texas, listed on the National Register of Historic Places in Harris County, Texas